Microeurydemus wraniki is a species of leaf beetle of Yemen, described by  in 1994.

References

Eumolpinae
Beetles of Asia
Insects of the Arabian Peninsula
Beetles described in 1994
Endemic fauna of Yemen